The Combined Joint Operations from the Sea - Centre of Excellence (CJOS COE) is a multinational military Centre of Excellence located in Norfolk, Virginia, accredited by NATO.  The current director is Vice Admiral Daniel Dwyer of the United States Navy and the current deputy director is Commodore Tom Guy of the British Royal Navy.

Overview
CJOS COE is a pre-eminent, independent, multi-national source of innovative advice and expertise on all aspects of maritime operations, charged with developing and promoting maritime concepts and doctrine in order for NATO, Sponsoring Nations, Allies and other international partners and organizations to optimize the efficient delivery of Maritime Effect.

Mission
To support the Sponsoring Nations and NATO in improving their ability to conduct Allied combined joint operations from the sea in order to counter current and emerging maritime global security challenges.

Vision
Working closely with partners and stakeholders from international militaries, governments, non-governmental agencies, industry, and academic communities of interest, CJOS COE aims to be the Alliance's source of expertise in the conduct of combined and joint operations in the maritime environment.

History
The CJOS COE was established on May 31, 2006, by the signing of two Memoranda of Understanding (MOU):

 the Operational MOU between the Ministry of Defenses of the host nation (United States) and twelve additional Sponsoring Nations; the MOU formally establishes the CJOS COE and makes provisions for its operation, funding, manning, equipment, and infrastructure, as well as for its administrative and logistical support;
 the Functional MOU establishes the functional relationship between HQ SACT and the CJOS COE. This MOU has been signed by Strategic Allied Command – Transformation and the thirteen Sponsoring Nations.

References

External links
 CJOS COE official website
 CJOS COE Twitter
 https://sldinfo.com/2021/04/the-alliance-aspect-of-shaping-the-new-second-fleet-the-role-of-cjos-coe/ - Second Line of Defense

NATO agencies
Organizations based in Virginia